Mohamad Hanafi bin Mohd Akbar (born 7 February 1995) is a Singaporean professional footballer who plays as a midfielder for Singapore Premier League side Tampines Rovers and the Singapore national team.

Career

Youth career 
Hanafi represented the Singapore national under-14 team at the 2009 Asian Youth Games, and was part of the national under-15 team which won the bronze medal at the 2010 Summer Youth Olympics. He attracted interests from Tottenham Hotspur F.C. and Juventus F.C. for his exploits at youth level.

However, he failed to capitalise on his talents, choosing the influence of bad company instead, Hanafi skipped training with the National Football Academy and quit the team in 2013.

Balestier Khalsa 
He eventually signed a two-year contract with S.League club Balestier Khalsa in December 2013 after being written off as a "rebel" by many coaches.

However, he was arrested for drug use in 2015 and was eventually sentenced for a year's imprisonment. Hanafi rejoined the Tigers in 2017 after his release and made his return to football in a S.League game against Garena Young Lions on 2 April 2017. Coming on as a half-time substitute, Hanafi showed his early promise by playing a part in his team's solitary goal of the game. Hanafi controlled the ball on his chest before sending a glorious cross-field volley to teammate Hazzuwan Halim, who squared the ball for Myanmar forward Aung Kyaw Naing to slot home the winner from close range.

Honours 
Singapore U15
 Summer Youth Olympics: bronze medalist, 2010

References

External links 
 

1995 births
Living people
Singaporean footballers
Association football midfielders
Association football forwards
Balestier Khalsa FC players
Singapore Premier League players
Footballers at the 2010 Summer Youth Olympics
Competitors at the 2017 Southeast Asian Games
Southeast Asian Games competitors for Singapore